Club Deportivo Miguelturreño is a football team based in Miguelturra in the autonomous community of Castile-La Mancha. 

Founded in 1975, it plays in the 1ª Autonómica Preferente. Its home ground is Estadio Municipal with a capacity of 1,000 seats.

Season to season

3 seasons in Tercera División

External links
Futbolme.com profile
Profile at ffcm.es 

Football clubs in Castilla–La Mancha
Divisiones Regionales de Fútbol clubs
Association football clubs established in 1975
1975 establishments in Spain